Amerikan Anthaphan  (อเมริกันอันธพาล) is the nineteenth album by Thai rock band Carabao. It was released in 1998.

Track listing

1998 albums
Carabao (band) albums